The 1902 American Medical football team was an American football team that represented the American Medical College of Chicago in the 1902 college football season.

Schedule

Roster

This Roster was compiled by an account of the Notre Dame game.

 Madernack, left end
 Clark, left tackle
 Sheets, left guard
 Laws, center
 Klingermuth, right guard
 Limberg, right tackle
 Stevens, right end
 Converse, quarterback
 Mitchell, left halfback
 Haywood, right halfback
 Butch, fullback

References

American Medical
American Medical football seasons
American Medical football